The ISAF Team Racing World Championship is a team racing event now held every two years by the International Sailing Federation (ISAF). The first Team Racing World Championships were held in West Kirby, Great Britain in 1995. Great Britain won and so became the first nation to record its name on the ISAF Team Racing World Trophy, donated to ISAF by the West Kirby Sailing Club. 
A youth Championship (under 21) began running in parallel with the main event since 2005. Summary information on the first three events is tabled below - full information will be found on the Team Racing Championships results page of the ISAF website.  The appearance of West Kirby as the first championship host club reflects the Club's pivotal role in promoting team racing – fostered by the activities of the Oxford & Cambridge Sailing Society.

Results

Other
420, International 14 and Optimist (dinghy) classes hold also hold (their own) a team racing based World Championships.

References and External Links

World Sailing
Team